Nuno Borges and Francisco Cabral were the defending champions and successfully defended their title, defeating Zdeněk Kolář and Adam Pavlásek 6–4, 6–0 in the final.

Seeds

Draw

References

External links
 Main draw

Open de Oeiras II - Doubles